Shin Dong-bin(Japanese name : Akio Shigemitsu) is Korean Japanese businessman.

Shin Dong-bin may also refer to:

 Shin Dong-bin(footballer) (born 1985), South Korean football player